This is a list of hospitals in Saskatchewan.

Saskatchewan
Hospitals